Papua New Guinea competed at the 1992 Summer Olympics in Barcelona, Spain.

Competitors
The following is the list of number of competitors in the Games.

Results by event

Athletics
Men's 100m metres
Bernard Manana 
 Heat — 11.35 (→ did not advance)

Men's 4 × 400 m Relay
Baobo Neuendorf, Kaminiel Selot, Selot Bernard, and Manana Subul Babo
 Heat — 3:13.35 (→ did not advance)

Men's 400m Hurdles
Baobo Neuendorf
 Heat — 53.30 (→ did not advance, no ranking)

Women's 10.000 metres
Rosemary Turare
 Heat — 42:02.79 (→ did not advance)

Sailing
Men's Sailboard (Lechner A-390)
Graham Numa
 Final Ranking — 438.0 points (→ 43rd place)

References

Official Olympic Reports

Nations at the 1992 Summer Olympics
1992
1992 in Papua New Guinean sport